My Name Is Khan is a 2010 drama film directed by Karan Johar and written by Shibani Bathija and Niranjan Iyengar. It stars Shah Rukh Khan and Kajol in lead roles. In the film, Rizwan Khan (Khan), an autistic Muslim, sets out on a journey across the United States to meet the President after Mandira (Kajol), his Hindu wife, suffers from Islamophobic discrimination after the September 11 attacks. 

Johar began developing the film by 2007, seeking a departure from his previous romantic films; it is Johar's first directorial effort where he did not contribute to the screenplay. Johar and Bathija extensively researched autism in preparation for the film, especially Asperger's syndrome, as well as Islam. The film was co-produced by Johar's mother, Hiroo Yash Johar, and Khan's wife, Gauri Khan, under their respective production companies Dharma Productions and Red Chillies Entertainment. Khan and Kajol's involvement was confirmed by May 2008, with the remainder of the cast rounded out by January 2009. Principal photography began in December 2008 and lasted until October 2009, with filming locations including Los Angeles, Mumbai, and San Francisco. The film's soundtrack was composed by Shankar–Ehsaan–Loy.

My Name Is Khan first premiered in the United Arab Emirates on 10 February 2010 and was theatrically released worldwide two days later by 20th Century Fox. It grossed  worldwide, becoming the highest-grossing Hindi film of 2010 and the second-highest-grossing Indian film of 2010. It received numerous awards and nominations, including three wins at the 56th Filmfare Awards, with praise for Johar's direction, the screenplay, soundtrack, and performances (particularly from Khan and Kajol); it is used as a scholarly case study for its cinematic portrayal of autism and Islamophobia.

Plot
Rizwan Khan, a Muslim, grew up with his brother, Zakir, and his widowed mother, Razia, in a middle-class family in Borivali, Mumbai. His autism leads to special tutoring from a reclusive scholar and extra attention from his mother, all of which leads to a heightened level of jealousy from Zakir, who eventually leaves his family for a life in San Francisco. Despite this, Zakir sponsors Rizwan to come and live with him after their mother's death. Zakir's wife Haseena diagnoses Rizwan as having Asperger syndrome. Rizwan also begins to work for Zakir's. He meets Hindu woman Mandira and her young son Sameer, born from a previous marriage. Despite Zakir's uncertainty, they marry and live in the fictional Banville, adopting Rizwan's surname as theirs. They also live next door to the Garrick family; Sam is close to their young son, Reese.

The Khans' perfect existence gets disrupted following the September 11 attacks. Mark goes to cover the war in Afghanistan but dies there. At the same time, the Khans begin to experience the post 9/11 prejudice, and Reese begins to turn against Sam. Their rivalry causes an eventual fight on a soccer field, where a bunch of older students attack Sam. One of them kicks a football at Sam, rupturing his spleen and killing him. A grieving Mandira blames Rizwan, stating that Sam died solely because of Rizwan's surname. Consequently, when Rizwan asks what he can do to help, Mandira sarcastically tells him that to be back together, he has to tell the people and President of the United States that his name is Khan and he is not a terrorist.

Rizwan, taking her seriously, thus sets out on a road trip to first meet President George W. Bush and later President-elect Barack Obama. He travels to the fictional Wilhemina, Georgia, and befriends Mama Jenny and her son Joel. While at a mosque in Los Angeles, he overhears violent rhetoric from a doctor, Faisal Rehman who is quoting religious texts, and angrily defies Faisal's statements before walking out to drop a message for the Federal Bureau of Investigation (FBI). While waiting in a crowd at UCLA to meet President Bush, he says, "My name is Khan and I am not a terrorist!", repeatedly. He is arrested due to misinterpretation as "I am a terrorist."

Rizwan is interrogated as a terrorist suspect but is released after a media campaign by Indian student reporters Raj, Komal and Bobby Ahuja, who prove his innocence by revealing his attempts to inform the FBI about Faisal. After his release, he returns to the hurricane-hit Wilhemina to help Mama Jenny, Joel, and everyone there, attracting media attention. Reese, seeing Rizwan on TV, finally confesses to Mandira his knowledge of what happened to Sam, and reveals the identity of the boys who killed him. She informs Detective Garcia, who has been assisting her on the case, and the boys, including Reese, are arrested.

Mandira joins Rizwan in Georgia. At the moment she arrives, Rizwan is stabbed by one of Faisal Rehman's followers who accuses him of being a traitor to Islam, and is hospitalized. Rizwan survives and meets Obama, who tells him: "Your name is Khan and you are not a terrorist". Rizwan in turn tells that not only him, his son Sameer was not a terrorist. Obama apologizes to him for the problems that happened to them.

Cast 
The cast is listed below:

 Shah Rukh Khan as Rizwan Khan
 Adarsh Gourav as young Rizwan in his teenage years
 Tanay Chheda as young Rizwan in his early years
 Kajol as Mandira Rathod Khan
 Dominic Renda as Mark Garrick
 Jennifer Echols as Mama Jenny
 Kenton Duty as Reese Garick
 Katie A. Keane as Sarah
 Benny Nieves as Detective Garcia
 Christopher B. Duncan as Barack Obama
 Yuvaan Makar as Sameer "Sam" Rathod Khan
 Sheetal Menon as Radha
 Arjun Mathur as Raj
 Sugandha Garg as Komal
 Jimmy Sheirgill as Zakir Khan
 Navneet Nishan as Rita Singh
 Zarina Wahab as Razia Khan
 Arif Zakaria as Faisal Rahman
 Sonya Jehan as Hasina Khan
 Vinay Pathak as Jitesh
 Parvin Dabas as Bobby Ahuja
 Sumeet Raghavan as an attacker

Production

Development 

Having worked on a number of romantic dramas and consequently become known for these, Karan Johar desired to experiment with a new genre. He wanted it to be one that would attract critical and commercial success, as well as help prove his ability of making non-romantic films to his audience. Eventually, the idea of making a socially relevant film came to his mind, "because that is what those kinds of people like". He chose to depict Islam as a main topic of discussion — an action that he described as a "conscious decision" — since he felt there is an international unawareness and negative generalization towards the religion. While himself belonging not to the religion, he called himself educated and open-minded enough to understand that misconceptions against Islam exist. As a filmmaker, Johar wanted to communicate with his audience of his message, which is "correcting the world's misconceptions about Islam", in an emotional, yet effective, manner.

In November 2007, Bollywood Hungama reported a then-untitled upcoming project by Johar. The filmmaker told the entertainment portal that there would be possibility it would be rather titled My Name Is Khan or simply Khan. In a July 2008 article in his personal blog, Johar confirmed the title as My Name Is Khan, breaking his tradition of initiating his works' titles with the letter "K". He said, "While deciding upon the title, I just went by my gut and decided on something which brings to fore the spirit of the film and the story that I wanted to tell. Everything was decided in true earnest. The right title of the film was and stays on as My Name Is Khan."

Shibani Bathija wrote the story and screenplay while penning the dialogues with Johar's then-regular collaborator Niranjan Iyengar, thus making My Name Is Khan Johar's first film he did not write himself, though he still helped her in the research. According to Johar, it gave him "a level of detachment from the proceedings and yet, a lot of attachment" and released "unexplored emotions". In preparation, Bathija and Johar met a lot of people with autism, including those who have Asperger's syndrome; Bathija also read books about their condition, including An Asperger Marriage and Aspergers in Love, non-fictions about the life of a woman with his husband, who suffers from Asperger. Johar suggested to have a Muslim character in the lead and set the film in the September 11 attacks, which Bathija eventually agreed with.

Geographically, the story sets in the San Francisco Bay Area, which came to Bathija's inspirations because of her familiarity with the place while finishing her communication study at the San Francisco State University between 1998 and 2000. Her motivation to use it as the film's backdrop increased in 2007 after seeing many Bollywood films also being shot there. A fictional town, Banville, which she described as "a stereotypically white, upper-class Bay Area suburb", was also added into the story. In an interview to the East Bay Express, Bathija recounted that while researching for the San Francisco Bay by Google Maps from Mumbai, she spotted Danville, California, which fitted her criteria of a location that resembles a "small, very rich suburban town". Beside that, Bathija also wrote the English-language dialogues, while Niranjan Iyengar wrote the Hindi ones. A number of Arabic phrases, mostly in religious context, were also added.

The film was co-produced by Hiroo Yash Johar of Karan Johar's Dharma Productions and Gauri Khan of Shah Rukh Khan's Red Chillies Entertainment. The partnership was announced in February 2009; on co-producing the film under his own banner, Shah Rukh Khan said he disliked to presell films, especially non-commercial ones, like My Name Is Khan, and wanted Johar to finish it without taking a loan as well as to collectively own the film. The budget was estimated to have been , according to the financial newspaper Mint. The production was also handled in part with the American production houses Fox Star Studios and Fox Searchlight Pictures. In February 2010, the Abu Dhabi-based Image Nation joined to distributed the film, and nine months later, the Hong Kong-based Huaxia Film Distribution followed.

Casting 

Shanoo Sharma and Robi Reed handled the casting of My Name Is Khan. The earliest press reports appeared in October 2007, when Shah Rukh Khan and Kajol were reported to be cast in the lead. Karan Johar, however, clarified that while Shah Rukh Khan had accepted the offer, he had not been able to confirm whether Kajol would be in the casting, saying that he had not talked with her yet. During this period, Kareena Kapoor was reported to have offered herself to play opposite Shah Rukh Khan, until May 2008 at the time Kajol confirmed her presence. My Name Is Khan became Shah Rukh Khan and Kajol's sixth collaboration, after Baazigar (1993), Karan Arjun (1995), Dilwale Dulhania Le Jayenge (1995), Kuch Kuch Hota Hai (1998) and Kabhi Khushi Kabhie Gham... (2001), the latter two were also directed by Karan Johar.

Before Jimmy Sheirgill, Aamir Bashir was originally chosen to play the role of Zakir, Rizwan's younger brother. When filming began in December 2008, the United States authority refused to give Bashir a visa to travel to that because he did not mention his travel to Iran in the application form; since the Mumbai attacks, the country had been cautious of foreigners. The incident attracted considerable media attention, which led to his exclusion from the casting. Shabana Azmi was initially cast for portraying Rizwan's mother, Razia. However, owing to a delay caused by Shah Rukh Khan's shoulder surgery in January 2009, Azmi opted out; she continued to shoot for Gurinder Chadha-directed comedy-drama, It's a Wonderful Afterlife (2010). The role eventually went to Zarina Wahab.

In January 2009, Pakistani actress Sonya Jehan was reported to join the casting to play the supporting role of university professor Hasina Khan. Unlike Jehan's previous films that shows her in revealing clothes, this one has her wearing a hijab, the traditional head-covering for Muslim women. She was particularly drawn to her character and expressed a desire to play similar roles in the future. Child artist Tanay Chheda played the role of young Rizwan. Chheda's performance in the widely-acclaimed drama Slumdog Millionaire (2008), his resemblance of Shah Rukh Khan's appearance and his familiarity with Mumbai slums were the basis for Karan Johar to cast him. Instead of putting the footages of then-President Barack Obama, an actor physically similar to him was chosen. Forest Whitaker was the original possibility for the role, but he declined owing to conflicting schedule and disinclination to play Obama who was still in his office. The role eventually went to Christopher B. Duncan, who was cast two months after an audition.

Characters 

Karan Johar and Bathija researched extensively for Shah Rukh Khan's character in My Name Is Khan for two years, and this include their personal study of Asperger's syndrome and contacts with autistic people from various centers in London, New York, Los Angeles and India. When interviewed by Bollywood Hungama, he admitted to have helped her by "just executing her vision". Karan Johar and Bathija met Christopher and Gisela Slater-Walker, who wrote An Asperger Marriage, and he described the former as having been their significant inspiration for the character. They also had a rendezvous with Chris and Maxine Aston (Aspergers in Love writers), whom Karan Johar said to have been the "basis" for Rizwan and Mandira's relationship. Their research also included gathering information related to the condition from YouTube videos.

Shah Rukh Khan did his own research to his role, which Bathija stated to have been written specifically for him. He said that he was nervous but at the same time excited to play the type of role, which he had never done before. Karan Johar described him as being challenged, even considering Rizwan to be Shah Rukh Khan's "most challenging" character. Shah Rukh Khan himself referred to it as "the most interesting part" of his career as an actor, seeing that he could spread awareness about a condition that is rarely suffered from. His film characters are mainly secular; they are not especially focused on their religious background, but the one in My Name Is Khan is. Alluding to its autism, he referred to his My Name Is Khan character as a "neuro-atypical mind, who could do less and say more".

Karan Johar sent Shah Rukh Khan to the centers he had previously visited with Bathija; the director wanted the actor to socialize with autistic people, predominantly those with Asperger, and make his own Rizwan based on these interactions. Beside videos, Shah Rukh Khan continued his research with reading books about the syndrome, including the mystery novel The Curious Incident of the Dog in the Night-Time. Karan Johar observed that Shah Rukh Khan's research for the character was particularly extensive, admitting that it astonished him: "I was zapped by how much he knew on the subject. And he brought all the knowledge on the sets." While playing his character, the actor maintained expressionless eyes even when he was saying his dialogues, which he found difficult. To get it right, he practiced in bathroom for ten consecutive days.

Los Angeles-based Robin Slater, who had worked in films including How the Grinch Stole Christmas (2000), Memoirs of a Geisha (2005) and Dreamgirls (2006), was appointed to be Shah Rukh Khan's makeup artist by producer Prashant Shah. Slater described his look as "a natural sun-kissed one, very natural. He looks fresh and they all thought he looked much younger." She did his makeup in six steps and six minutes, starting with using a concealer to get rid of the flaws from his face. She then airbrushed the foundation on, put sunburn stipple around his chin, cheekbones, forehead, jaw and nose, and shaded the nose and jawline. After using powder gel to make him as if he wore no makeup, Slater removed airbrush overflow on his eyebrows and eyelashes.

Kajol was given with the role of Mandira, Rizwan's Hindu wife with a son from her previous marriage. She found My Name Is Khan to be thematically similar to Karan Johar's previous films, noting Kabhi Khushi Kabhie Gham... for instance. However, she added "there was more masala in them" in comparison to My Name Is Khan, which she called his deepest one. The complexity of her character, Mandira, made her emotionally engaged to it, and Kajol stated that this experience eventually gave her a life lesson: "It is okay to be imperfect as a human being." She described My Name Is Khan as an intense collaboration with her friend, Karan Johar, who asked her to lose weight for characterization.

In an interview to Indo-Asian News Service, Johar said that Kajol had always been the one in his mind while casting for an actress to play Mandira. On her spontaneous nature, he commented, "There is no method to her madness. She is sheer brilliance. Her expressions connect you immediately. She is all real, all woman, all human on screen and I don't think any living actress has the quality that Kajol has." His frequent collaborator, Manish Malhotra, was specifically chosen as her costume designer. As to her role as a San Francisco-based hairstylist, Kajol wore colorful clothes, including jackets and trousers; while her character is at home, she would be given more tracks and sweaters. In one of her scenes, she featured in a red sari, which was not Malhotra's design but was bought from a shop. Johar said that she did not want the fashion to distract the film's messages. Shiraz Siddique handled the rest of the cast's costumes.

Filming 

Principal photography was commenced by Ravi K. Chandran on 18 December 2008 in Los Angeles. Farah Khan and Sham Kaushal provided the choreography; Sharmishta Roy served as the production designer; Mohammed Kasim and Mansi Dhruv Mehta were the art directors; Sidharth Malhotra and Varun Dhawan, who would later make their film debuts with Johar's next directorial venture Student of the Year, also presented by Shah Rukh Khan, served as assistant directors. In January 2009, after a one-month schedule, Shah Rukh Khan went on to shoot an action scene in Dulha Mil Gaya (2010) but faced an accident that injured his shoulder. He underwent a physical therapy, and in the next month a surgery that made the shooting was delayed until the next month. After filming was continued, he faced severe migraines but only taking pills to relieve these. When the pain worsened he checked up to a doctor; his migraines were proven to have been the result of being in leaning position and raising his eyebrows for hours, which were required for his character. In January 2010, he had another physical therapy.

The Los Angeles schedule began in March 2009. In the next month, the slum scenes were shot in Borivali. The next two days, the film was shot at a mosque in Andheri. Filming then moved to San Francisco in May 2009 for a 40-day schedule. Coinciding with the start of the 2009 swine flu pandemic, it was done secretly to avoid public attention, and finished a month afterwards. In August 2009, the cast and crew moved to Film City for shooting the hurricane scene. A  tank was also made, and approximately 12 thousand liters of water were used for the scene. This schedule, which was the last of the production, began on 1 September and was completed in a month. During the filming, a snake reportedly entered the tank and panicked all the workers. My Name Is Khan was edited by Deepa Bhatia, while Dileep Subramaniam and Anuj Mathur were involved in the sound design. The film's final cut runs for 155 minutes.

Music 
Shankar–Ehsaan–Loy composed the soundtrack to My Name Is Khan, while Iyengar and Javed Akhtar (uncredited) provided the lyrics. The film has six original songs and four additional songs taken from Karan Johar's previous films. All the songs are played in the background; none with lip sync. When Iyengar had written two of the film's songs, Akhtar was approached to write the remaining but rejected the offers, citing his unwillingness to share credits. However, on Johar's persuasion, Akhtar later agreed to write one song though his name appeared not in the film's credits. My Name Is Khan features eight singers: Rahat Fateh Ali Khan, Shankar Mahadevan, Richa Sharma, Shreya Ghoshal, Adnan Sami, Shafqat Amanat Ali, Rashid Khan and Suraj Jagan. The album was released on 5 January 2010 by Sony Music. The Billboard magazine reported that it sold 150,000 units four days after its launch in India only, and proved to be a commercial success.

The soundtrack of the film received positive reviews from music critics. Joginder Tuteja of Bollywood Hungama wrote My Name Is Khan music does not has the romantic nature that is usual in Karan Johar's films, mainly Kuch Kuch Hota Hai, and gave it a rating of three out of five stars. Hindustan Times concluded, "On the whole, every song in the album is above-average. The composers have stuck to the theme of the film and the soundtrack has the potential to rock the charts." Sukanya Verma of Rediff.com found the music to have strong Sufi feels, opining that "it's neither fancy nor groundbreaking but warm enough to make us like it". Writing for the BBC, Jaspreet Pandohar described the soundtrack as a "mellow, spiritually-uplifting musical experience", while Mid-Day noted "the six-track album is worth occasional listening, but certainly not the soul-stirrer you were expecting". The Indo-Asian News Service included "Sajda" in their listing of 10 greatest Bollywood songs of 2010. The songs have been listed as following.

Marketing 

My Name Is Khan was screened as part of 60th Berlin International Film Festival's Official Selection in February 2010, out of competition. The website eBay auctioned the tickets for the film's screening at the Berlin Film Festival for a record price of £1,000 stg (60,000) each. All the tickets were sold out in five seconds.

The first look of My Name Is Khan unveiled at a grand ceremony at Mumbai by Johar, Khan and Kajol and was then beamed across 70 countries worldwide on the Star TV Network. Johar was excited and noted, "This is a first in the history of Bollywood – that the promos of a film will play across such a wide platform. And, this has mainly been made possible because of our synergy with Fox Star Studios ... and also the first time an Indian company is tying up with a mainstream American studio. So, there are many firsts to this venture." The trailer of the film was released at the premiere of Avatar (2009). My Name Is Khan marked the first instance of a film using the roadblock advertising technique to market a film, in which the three-minute trailer was aired on all leading television channels simultaneously.

The makers of the film made various brand tie-ups to for the promotion of the film. Reebok created an entire MNIK Footwear and Apparel Collection to promote the film.

On 1 February 2010, Khan and Kajol became the first Indian film stars to ring the opening bell of the New York stock exchange NASDAQ. They were invited by Fox Searchlight Pictures to do so as part of their promotion for My Name Is Khan. Khan also appeared on Friday Night with Jonathan Ross as part of its promotion in the UK, becoming only the second Indian after Shilpa Shetty to do so.

Release

Theatrical 
My Name Is Khan debuted in Abu Dhabi, UAE on 10 February 2010. It released globally in cinemas on 12 February 2010. MNIK had a two phase release. To begin with, it had a mainstream release in India coupled with a regular Diaspora release in UK, US, Gulf, Australia and various other countries. "After that in the months of April and May, we would be looking at a mainstream theatrical release in countries like Germany, Poland and other parts of North America," detailed Johar.

Pre-sale records 
It covers all rights except music, which has been secured by Sony Music India.

Home media 
The film was released in India on DVD on 21 April 2010, Blu-ray in India, plus a DVD release worldwide followed on 17 August 2010.

In the United Kingdom, it was 2012's sixth most-watched foreign-language film on television with 210,000 viewers on Channel 4, and the year's second most-watched Asian film (below the Chinese film Red Cliff).

Reception

Critical response 
My Name Is Khan received highly positive reviews from overseas publications, most of which echoed the same sentiments as of domestic critics.

India 

My Name Is Khan received highly positive reviews upon release, with particular praise directed towards its direction and the leads' performances, and has often been referred to as the director's magnum opus. 

In a -star review, Taran Adarsh wrote that Shah Rukh Khan's performance was his career's best so far and "no amount of praise can do sufficient justice to his portrayal". Adarsh also praised the decision to cast Kajol, whom he regarded as the one with the strongest chemistry with Shah Rukh Khan, and described her as having given "a powerhouse performance". Rediff.com's Raja Sen said Karan Johar had made "his first grown-up film", and described it as one "that will inspire, make aware, make happy". Sudhish Kamath wrote of the character Rizwan as "the epitome of goodness and surprisingly, the filmmaker tones down his sense of drama several notches, showing great restraint for at least two-thirds of the film".

Writing for The Hindu, Bhavishek Shah called the film a landmark to the careers of the director and its lead actors. The critic opined Shah Rukh Khan succeeded in playing his part: "Completely getting under the skin of the character, Shah Rukh has picked up every single nuance of an Asperger's syndrome patient without making it appear labored." Savera R. Someshwar of Rediff.com wrote that Kajol delivered a fine performance, taking note of her "laughter, her determination, her joie de vivre, her grief, her anger — Kajol brings it all to life. And, if I may say so, Kajol, no one runs up a hill dressed in a night suit, wearing floppy slippers, with no make-up on, as well as you do." Pratim D. Gupta of The Telegraph wrote that Shah Rukh Khan is outstanding and called his presence to be emotional equilibrium, and was excited to see him collaborating once again with Kajol. Writing for the Bangalore Mirror, Minty Tejpal saw the film was intended for an international market, noting its story that includes Islamophobia and African-American community.

BBC's Manish Gajjar believed Shah Rukh Khan had shown his versatility as an actor within his emotional performance and considered it to be his best. On Kajol, Gajjar thought she had given an equally commendable performance, especially in the second half where her character, Mandira, is shown as being egocentric after losing her son. Minu Jain of The New Indian Express complimented Karan Johar for exploring a genre that is not romance-centric and labelled the film "a road journey through a troubled post 9/11 America towards humanism". Mayank Shekhar of the Hindustan Times also praised his move to experiment outside the typically musical Bollywood cinema; Shekhar wrote positively of Bathija's screenplay, which he called compelling enough for praise. Subhash K. Jha referred to the film as "a flawless work, as perfect in content, tone and treatment as any film can get". Anna M. M. Vetticad lauded My Name Is Khan story, claiming that it had been able to made her cry.

Anupama Chopra said Shah Rukh Khan's character Rizwan as the greatest part of the film. Sukanya Venkatraghavan of Filmfare asserted, "To say MNIK is a warm-the-cockles film about a man with Asperger syndrome who overcomes all odds and triumphs would be to pigeonhole it. The movie has a larger picture-one of humanity, tolerance, redemption and above all love." Kaveree Bamzai of India Today said the film deserves to be watched not for its message but Shah Rukh Khan. Alike views were shared by Rajeev Masand, who encouraged people to watch it for the cast; Masand further stated that the message of religious tolerance is significant but not unique. Mid-Day Sarita Tanwar argued, "In a near-perfect film, the only over-the-top part is Rizwan's return to a flood-hit small town to save the African-American family. It's stands out because everything else is so understated." A scathing opinion was expressed by Ajit Duara of Open magazine, who labelled it "an expensive and empty vessel", attributing it to "the naivete of its treatment and the hack job that Karan Johar does with all the actors in this huge production".

In a review to Ananda Bazar Patrika, Indroneil Sarkar disliked the film for its heavy subject and commented that the flood scene of the second half should have been edited out in entirety. Vinod Mirani of Box Office India criticized the film as "an average film, lavishly made", and remarked, "As a director, Karan has treated the subject too leisurely, and consequently the pace slows down and the film drags at time. He's trying to say too many things." Ajay Brahmatraj of Dainik Bhaskar, while commending Karan Johar for this time picking a complex subject, found the story not well written. Man's World Maithili Rao wrote, "It works only in the first half. Post interval there's too much drama, in particular the flood scene. They were trying to make a hero of an ordinary man. That spoilt the effect of the first half." Deepa Gahlot of The Afternoon Despatch & Courier dismissed the film as being not one "that will evoke an instant reaction", concluding: "After a while, instead of feeling sympathetic, you are put off."

International 

In spite of being critical of the film's flood subplot and topics not fully explored, such as the Iraq War, Sight & Sound Naman Ramachandran wrote Shah Rukh Khan carried out the film despite its flaws. Itrath Syed of The Georgia Straight called My Name Is Khan "a multilayered, politically nuanced, and emotionally demanding film". Syed noted there are "places where Johar leans too heavily on melodrama. Yet he does reveal an American experience in which fear and suspicion are commonplace, and to which people of color have simply adjusted." Mark Jenkins of NPR wrote the film "transplants Bollywood's audacious style and brazen sentimentality to Hollywood's America". Jenkins, however, was ambivalent of Shah Rukh Khan, whose characterization of Asperger syndrome the critic found to be dubious.

Box office 
My Name Is Khan opened very well in most places across the world, and set many records in the process. However, the performance of the film could not sustain beyond the first or second week in some places, including India and USA. The film's performance in India was quite good but still is generally regarded as "below expectations" due to the high price, while the overseas performance of the film has been record breaking. By 4 April 2010, the worldwide gross revenue for My Name Is Khan from the box office was US$36,145,870.

India 
In India, the film opened with a massive  (US$6,356,688), which was the third-highest weekend net for a Bollywood film, behind 3 Idiots and Ghajini. It recorded the third-highest first day business across India, behind 3 Idiots and Ghajini at the time of release. The film broke the record of Race for the biggest opening weekend in the first quarter of the year. The film was reported to have done very well in multiplexes, but comparatively on the lower side in single screens. The film managed to net  in its first week.

In rankings based on distributor share, My Name Is Khan comes in fifth behind Dabangg, Raajneeti, Golmaal 3 and Housefull; in a way bearing out Sajid Khan's boast that Housefull will surpass MNIK in India. The film managed to retain the No. 1 spot at the Indian box office for two consecutive weeks, and remained in the top five for six consecutive weeks. At the end of its theatrical run, the film earned  in India.

The film faced considerable falls in collections after its first week. The drops in collections became evident from the fact that 63% of the film's net collections came from the first week, as compared to 54% for Race, 56% for Ghajini, 49% for Rab Ne Bana Di Jodi and 39% for 3 Idiots. In spite of this, the film managed to retain the No. 1 position at the box office for two consecutive weeks. It was in the top 5 list of the Indian box office for six consecutive weeks. Though the mid-week collections saw a drop of 60% from the opening weekend, it held up well against other major releases and secured the highest first quarter collections, a record previously held by Race. Thus, the film is a financial success owing to its record-breaking overseas collections and healthy domestic collections.

Overseas 
My Name Is Khan grossed US$23.5 million in the overseas markets. The film grossed the biggest opening day overseas, taking an estimated , beating the overseas opening day collections of 3 Idiots. The film also grossed the biggest opening weekend overseas, taking an estimated , again beating the overseas opening weekend collections of 3 Idiots which grossed . In its first week, it grossed . As of August 2010, the film has grossed $4,018,771 in the United States and $37,001,087 elsewhere for a worldwide total of $41,019,858.

In the UK, it made £123,000 on its opening day, which was more than the combined total of 3 Idiots in its first two days (£121,000). By the end of the second week, MNIK became only the third Bollywood film to cross the £2 million mark in the UK, after Kabhi Alvida Naa Kehna and Veer-Zaara, according to the exchange rates prevailing at their respective times of release.

My Name Is Khan debuted in USA in 120 theatres, breaking the record set by 3 Idiots which debuted in 119 theatres. The film broke the record for an opening weekend in the US, earning US$1,994,027. The film debuted at No. 13 at the American box office. By the end of the first week, the film grossed US$2,552,283, second only to 3 Idiots which had a Christmas holiday week. By the fourth week, the film earned US$3,868,891 (193,820,016), breaking Shah Rukh Khan's previous record set by Om Shanti Om. On the 51st day of screening in the US, My Name Is Khan broke the US$4 million barrier, and became only the second Bollywood film ever to cross this mark, after 3 Idiots.

In Australia, the film earned A$39,000 (1610,000) on its opening day, and was ranked No. 11 in the market. By the first weekend, the film earned US$437,687, defeating the previous record set by 3 Idiots (US$350,000). In New Zealand and Fiji, the film earned NZ$13,627 on its opening day, and earned NZ$144,831 (US$100,698) in its first week. By the end of its theatrical run, the film earned NZ$232,586.

In the Middle East, the response to the film has been described as "huge" and it earned approximately US$300,000 on its opening day. In Egypt it earned . By the end of its theatrical run, the film grossed US$517,018.

My Name Is Khan also opened well in Sri Lanka, Pakistan and the Far East. The film is the highest-grossing film in Pakistan, breaking the records set by Avatar, 3 Idiots and Wanted. By its third week, MNIK became the highest-grossing Bollywood film in the Middle East, earning US$3.3 million. In South Africa, the film earned US$85,214 (39.28 lakh) in its opening weekend. In Malaysia, it earned RM 105,527 (US$31,106) in its opening weekend, and by the second weekend, the film had earned RM 410,864 (US$120,452). In Nigeria, the film earned an "impressive" ₦2,310,137 (US$15,362) in its opening weekend. In Ghana, the film earned GH₵10,599 (US$7,443) by the second weekend. In Indonesia, the film grew from 6 to 14 screens and saw a jump of 300 percent in week three. The film has also grossed $425,825 in 7 weeks at the Bahrain box office. The film has also grossed an impressive $55,073 in Poland in its opening weekend. The film grossed $270,698 in South Africa. In South Korea, the film grossed $2,618,866. The film also made $58,683 in Lebanon. My Name is Khan released in Hong Kong on 5 January 2012 and collected US$107,197.

Box office records 
My Name Is Khan created several records, both in India and around the world. In India, the film smashed the record for a Bollywood release in the month of February, breaking the previous two-year record held by Jodhaa Akbar (2008). The film also broke the record for a Bollywood release in the first quarter of the year, breaking the previous two-year record held by Race (2008).

Overseas, it became the highest-grossing Indian film in overseas markets at the time, and the first Indian film to gross over  overseas. In the UK, the film broke the four-year record of Kabhi Alvida Naa Kehna (2006), and became the highest-grossing Bollywood film in the UK. In the Middle East, it is also the highest-grossing Bollywood film.

Awards 

In 2017, Khan was honoured at the San Francisco Film festival for his role in the film, seven years after the release of MNIK.

Music 

The soundtrack is composed by the musical trio Shankar–Ehsaan–Loy, who previously teamed up with Johar for his previous films Kal Ho Naa Ho (2003) and Kabhi Alvida Naa Kehna (2006). The lyrics are penned by Niranjan Iyengar. The audio rights of the film were purchased by Sony Music Entertainment, which had also previously released music for all of Johar's past releases, which gained global musical success. The album was released on 1 January 2010. The musical soundtrack consists of 6 original songs and 4 bonus tracks that are taken from Johar's previous successful films featuring Khan. The soundtrack includes one instrumental called "Khan Theme", composed by Indrajit Sharma and the strings for the song are performed by the Bombay Film Orchestra. The songs such as "Noor-e-Khuda" blend western bar blues and techno sounds with Indian classical styles such as Sufi and Hindustani. The song "Allah hi Rahem" sung by Ustad Rashid Khan is another example of Sufi thematic song. The soundtrack is thus representative of the "indie fusion genre". Unlike all of Johar's other films, none of the songs plays in lip-sync format, instead playing in the background.

Although Iyengar is alone credited for writing the lyrics for the songs, he penned the only two Sufi songs in the film, "Sajda" and "Allah Hi Rahem". Shankar–Ehsaan–Loy's previous collaborator Javed Akhtar was approached to write the lyrics for the remaining three songs. Earlier, it was reported that Akhtar refused to write lyrics because he did not want to share credits with another lyricist. Later, Johar confirmed that Akhtar penned the remaining songs, but did not want to be credited as lyricist when the soundtrack released. Akhtar confirmed this and said, "I don't like to share the credits. I would have got the publicity but the other person, who has done a fine job, wouldn't have. I have read the songs penned by Niranjan and I think he has done a great job."

Reception 

Upon release, the album received positive reviews from music critics. Gianysh Toolsee of Planet Bollywood stated that the soundtrack was "very much about transcending the boundaries set by Bollywood by venturing into an emotional state through Sufism and spirituality." and gave the album 8/10. Joginder Tuteja of Bollywood Hungama gave the album a three out of five stars, suggesting that Johar along with musicians Shankar–Ehsaan–Loy and lyricist Niranjan Iyengar "have brought not a partial but a substantial difference to the way music in [Johar's] films is being looked at." Hindustan Times rated the album 3.5 out of 5 and stated "Every song in the album is above average. The composers have stuck to the theme of the film and the soundtrack has the potential to rock the charts." Sukanya Verma of Rediff gave the album 3 out of 5 stating, "As for the soundtrack, it's neither fancy nor groundbreaking but warm enough to make us like it." Glamsham rated the album 4/5 with a statement "Karan has crafted a beautiful film, while SRK has authored a marketing strategy that will be hard for even Aamir Khan to beat!" The BBC review stated, "With four bonus songs taken from the director's box office successes that have featured Shah Rukh and Kajol together (plus a theatrical trailer for My Name Is Khan), there are plenty of extras goodies for hardcore Bollywood fans. But placed side by side, Shankar-Ehsaan-Loy's latest soundtrack may not seem as memorable as past collaborations."

Controversies

Airport security 
Khan has stated that due to his last name and religion, he (like Rizwan Khan) is frequently subject to excess security checks at airports. On 14 August 2009, Khan arrived in the United States to promote My Name Is Khan and to participate in South Asian-related events around the country (including Indian Independence Day). Upon arriving at Newark Airport in New Jersey, he was pulled aside by immigration officers after his name popped up on their computers, questioned for over an hour (Khan claims it was at least two hours) about the nature of his visit, and was later released. According to the Times Online, "In Delhi, Timothy J. Roemer, the American Ambassador to India, said that the embassy was trying to 'ascertain the facts of the case.' He added: 'Shah Rukh Khan, the actor and global icon, is a welcome guest in the United States.'"

Khan said he was told that it was because "they said my name was common to some name that popped up on the computer." The officials asked if he could provide names of people to vouch for him. Khan noted that he "had all the documents; they were asking me where I was going to be staying. I gave the name of FOX people with whom I had finalised a deal a few days ago as contacts." However, because they wanted to check his luggage which the airline had lost, Khan said that he "was taken to a room where many people were awaiting a secondary check on visa, most were South Asians. In fact many officers were reluctantly vouching for me, some people were asking for autographs and a Pakistani fan even said he knew who I was. But the officers said it was procedure and kept taking numbers from me."

While he was not allowed to use his own phone, Khan was permitted one phone call. He was thus released after officials from the Indian Consulate intervened. Civil Aviation Minister Praful Patel stated that the event will be further explored with U.S. officials. According to the BBC, "Elmer Camacho, a spokesman for the US Bureau of Customs and Border Protection, said the questioning was part of the agency's routine process to screen foreign travellers." When asked if he would demand an apology, Khan replied that he would not.

The director of My Name Is Khan, Karan Johar, was asked during an August 2009 interview with Mid-Day if the event was a publicity stunt for the film. Johar denied that it was and responded: "It's upsetting because I got a text message this morning asking me if it was a publicity plug for my movie. (Sarcastically) I mean, if I had that much power over the Homeland Security, why would I allow Shah Rukh to go through something like this? ... What's really shocking is the fact that when I was writing the film, I never thought that what happened to the protagonist of the film would happen to Shah Rukh." During a January 2010 interview, Khan referred to the implication that the event was a publicity stunt for the film as "lowdown and cheap." Christopher B. Duncan, who portrays President Obama in My Name Is Khan, also commented on the incident stating: "I was very disappointed with what SRK experienced at the airport. We're living in times where the levels of fear can sometimes spill over into paranoia. Here's a man who is an international superstar, being detained for an excessive amount of time at an airport in the United States. It had to be very upsetting for him. Imagine Oprah (Winfrey) being detained at an airport in India for a long time, during a kind of interrogation."

In addition, the incident sparked debate and commentary among Indian politicians, actors, and others. It also led to demonstrations in India. California Governor Arnold Schwarzenegger later invited Khan to have dinner with him "in a bid to diffuse what has become a slight diplomatic row."

In another event, on 5 February 2010, while promoting My Name Is Khan on the British talk show Friday Night with Jonathan Ross, Khan claimed that female security staff at Heathrow Airport in London had printed a naked image of him taken using the newly installed body scanner that he was asked to go through. He said that he autographed it for them, though it is not clear if his comments were intended as a joke. In relation to Khan's comments, The Economic Times has raised concerns over the new body scanners and the possibilities of it being abused to distribute naked pictures of celebrities. His comments have restarted the debate in Britain over whether the new scanners violate individual privacy.

Shiv Sena criticism 
After Shah Rukh Khan (who owns the Kolkata Knight Riders cricket team) criticized the fact that members of the Pakistani Cricket Team were not bought by the clubs competing in the 2010 Indian Premier League (IPL), he was condemned by Shiv Sena, a Hindu nationalist political party. There were consequent protests and demonstrations against him and demands that cinemas in India refuse to screen My Name Is Khan. Khan responded by stating, "What did I say that was wrong? All I said was that I wanted people to come to my country." Khan continued by stating that: "I have no idea what I am supposed to apologize for ... If I am in the wrong I would like to apologize but someone needs to explain to me what is wrong." He also stated that he does "not want any confrontation. I am trying to explain myself on every platform ... I have not said anything that is anti-national." Khan said that he was willing to meet with Bal Thackeray to discuss the issue.

Initially, Shiv Sena rescinded its demand to block release of My Name Is Khan after it was announced that Khan would be allowed to release it "in as many theatres" as he would like. However, on 17 February 2010, when cinemas opened for advanced bookings, individuals disguised as "cinegoers" began to attack cinemas and booking centers. Director Karan Johar and distributors met with police to ask for additional security. In response, Chief Minister of Maharashtra Ashok Chavan threatened to withdraw security cover for party leader Uddhav Thackeray. Later, some security was withdrawn and the Maharashtra government has "called in five battalions of the State Reserve Police Force to protect 63 cinemas in the city that will screen the film directed by Karan Johar from this Friday." There were multiple arrests and leave of all police officials were cancelled. The distributor, Fox Star, stated that the film would still be released on its scheduled opening date, 12 February. It opened to full cinema houses across India.

See also 

 List of cultural references to the September 11 attacks
 Asperger's syndrome

References

Bibliography

External links 
 
 
 
 

2010 films
2010s political films
Films about autism
Films based on the September 11 attacks
Films set in California
Films set in Los Angeles
Films set in Georgia (U.S. state)
Films set in Pennsylvania
Films set in San Francisco
Films shot in San Francisco
Films set in New York (state)
Films set in the 2000s
Cultural depictions of George W. Bush
Cultural depictions of Barack Obama
American political drama films
English-language Indian films
Asian-American drama films
Films about racism
Films about Islam
Fox Searchlight Pictures films
Fox Star Studios films
2010 drama films
Films set in the United States
Films shot in the United States
Films set in Philadelphia
Films shot in Philadelphia
Films set in New York City
Films shot in New York City
Films shot in Sacramento, California
Films set in the White House
Films set in Washington, D.C.
Films about Indian Americans
Films shot in India
20th Century Fox films
2010s Hindi-language films
Fictional portrayals of the New York City Police Department
Films set in Mumbai
Films shot in Mumbai
Films about Hollywood, Los Angeles
Films about the Federal Bureau of Investigation
Films about the New York City Police Department
2010s English-language films
2010 multilingual films
American multilingual films
Indian multilingual films
2010s American films
Films about disability